Morgon may refer to:

 Morgon (character), a fictional prince in the book The Riddle-Master of Hed
 Morgon (commune), a commune of France
 Lakes of Morgon, lakes of the Tinée in the French Alps
 Morgon (AOC), a French wine